Newton C. Young (January 28, 1862 – November 10, 1923) was an American judge who served as a justice of the Supreme Court of North Dakota from 1898 to 1906. He had previously served as the state's attorney of Pembina County, North Dakota.

Early life and education
Young was born on January 28, 1862, in Mount Pleasant, Iowa. He was the son of C.S. Young and Joanna E. Young. He received his elementary school education in Taber, Iowa and graduated from Iowa City Academy in 1882. In 1886 he graduated from Iowa State University with a Bachelor of Arts degree. He received Bachelor of Laws degree from the university the following year. He later received a Masters of Arts degree from the university in 1891.

Legal and judicial career

In 1887 Young moved to Bathgate, Dakota Territory. He practiced law there until getting appointed to the North Dakota Supreme Court. While practicing law in this period, he also served two terms as the state's attorney of Pembina County from 1892 through 1896. Politically, Young was a Republican.

In 1898, at the age of 36, he was appointed by Governor Joseph M. Devine to complete the term of Guy C. H. Corliss on the North Dakota Supreme Court. Young, nominated by the Republican Party, was elected in his own right that year to a full term. His opponent had been Charles J. Fisk.  He was reelected to a second term in 1904. He served on the court for approximately seven years and ten and one-half months. He was chief justice for a time. In 1906, Young resigned from the court. He practiced law in Fargo, North Dakota until his death. After resigning from the court he joined the firm Ball, Watson & Young (later Watson & Young). The firm served as division counsel of the Northern Pacific Railway.

Young served as a trustee of North Dakota State University from 1907 through 1915.

Personal life and death
Young married Ida B. Clarke on June 23, 1887, in Iowa City, Iowa. They had one son and two daughters. He was a member of several organizations and fraternities, including Phi Delta Theta and Phi Beta Kappa, and the Shriners.

Young died on November 10, 1923, at the age of 61.

External links
North Dakota Supreme Court biography

References

Justices of the North Dakota Supreme Court
1862 births
1923 deaths
People from Mount Pleasant, Iowa
People from Pembina County, North Dakota
People from Fargo, North Dakota
North Dakota Republicans
Phi Delta Theta
District attorneys in North Dakota
Iowa State University alumni